The 2020–21 UD Almería season was the club's 31st season in existence and the club's sixth consecutive season in the second division of Spanish football. In addition to the domestic league, Almería participated in this season's edition of the Copa del Rey. The season covered the period from 17 August 2020 to 30 June 2021.

Squad

Transfers

In

Total spending:  €0

Out

Total gaining:  €0

Balance
Total:  €1,000,000

Pre-season and friendlies

Competitions

Overview

Segunda División

League table

Results summary

Results by round

Matches
The league fixtures were announced on 31 August 2020.

Promotion play-offs

Copa del Rey

Player statistics

Appearances and goals

|-
! colspan=12 style=background:#dcdcdc; text-align:center|Goalkeepers

|-
! colspan=12 style=background:#dcdcdc; text-align:center|Defenders

|-
! colspan=12 style=background:#dcdcdc; text-align:center|Midfielders

|-
! colspan=12 style=background:#dcdcdc; text-align:center|Forwards

|-
! colspan=12 style=background:#dcdcdc; text-align:center| Players on loan to other clubs

|-
! colspan=12 style=background:#dcdcdc; text-align:center| Players who left the club midway through the season

|-
|}

Top scorers

Disciplinary record

Notes

References

External links

UD Almería seasons
Almería